Mualzen is a village in the Champhai district of Mizoram, India. It is located in the Khawzawl R.D. Block.

Demographics 

According to the 2011 census of India, Mualzen has 3 households. The effective literacy rate (i.e. the literacy rate of population excluding children aged 6 and below) is 100%.

References 

Villages in Khawzawl block